The 1963 Clemson Tigers football team was an American football team that represented Clemson University in the Atlantic Coast Conference (ACC) during the 1963 NCAA University Division football season. In its 24th season under head coach Frank Howard, the team compiled a 5–4–1 record (5–2 against conference opponents), tied for third place in the ACC, and outscored opponents by a total of 181 to 140. The team played its home games at Memorial Stadium in Clemson, South Carolina.

The South Carolina game moved from November 23 to November 28 (Thanksgiving) due to the Assassination of John F. Kennedy.

Tracy Childers was the team captain. The team's statistical leaders included Jim Parker with 728 passing yards, Pat Crain with 513 rushing yards and 24 points scored (4 touchdowns), and Johnny Case with 232 receiving yards.

Schedule

References

Clemson
Clemson Tigers football seasons
Clemson Tigers football